Stellaria neglecta, the greater chickweed, is an annual or short-lived herbaceous perennial flowering plant in the family Caryophyllaceae. It is native to Europe.

Taxonomy

Stellaria neglecta forms part of a complex that also includes S. media and S. pallida. The last of these is generally separable on morphological grounds, but there is no clear-cut morphological distinction between S. neglecta and S. media, which are easily confused; neglecta was formerly treated as a subspecies of S. media.

Description

Stellaria neglecta resembles  S. media, but is generally larger in all its parts. It has weak branching stems, that are usually decumbent at the base, ascending distally to around 80–90 cm. Between each pair of nodes, the stem carries a single row of hairs. The lower leaves are long-stalked, with the leaf blade 1−2.5 cm long and the stalk up to twice as long; the upper leaves have a short flattened stalk or are sessile, with the leaf blade up to 5 cm long; the leaf blade is ovate to broadly elliptical, acuminate, and glabrous.

Flowers are borne on long slender stalks which are glabrous or pubescent, initially spreading and reflexed, later erect. There are five sepals, 5−6.5 mm long, lanceolate, glabrous or pubescent, with an acute apex. The five petals are white, deeply bifid, the cleft extending almost to the base and giving the impression that there are actually ten petals; in length the petals are equal to or slightly longer than the sepals. The flowers are about 10 mm in diameter. There are usually 8-10 stamens and three styles.

Stellaria neglecta flowers between April and July, after which the flowering parts decay. The stems remain alive and produce tillers which overwinter and flower the following year.

Seeds are tuberculate, dark reddish-brown, 1.3−1.7 mm in diameter. The tubercles are conical, with an acute apex.

Distribution

Greater chickweed is widely distributed throughout Europe, from the Mediterranean to the Baltic and Scandinavia, and from the British Isles to Ukraine, but is nowhere common. In Great Britain, it is most common in the south and west, infrequent in the north. In North America, it was formerly rare, but it has spread rapidly in recent decades and is now considered a weed in a number of states, from Maryland to California.

Habitat

Stellaria neglecta prefers damp, shady conditions, and is usually found in woodland, hedges or on the banks of streams.

Similar species

Separation of S. neglecta from S. media on morphological grounds alone is difficult. In Britain, Whitehead and Sinha found that specimens with ten perfect stamens, petals more or less equalling the sepals, and growing on the margins of streams, lakes or other damp places, were assignable to S. neglecta. While S. neglecta usually has ten stamens, S. media may have as few as 3−7. Other differences are that S. neglecta is invariably found as a ruderal in damp conditions, while S. media also occurs as a weed, in a variety of habitats, including cultivated ground; and S. neglecta flowers only between April and July, while S. media flowers throughout the year.

References

neglecta